Joe Bertram may refer to:

 Joe Bertram (Hawaii politician) (born 1957)
 Joe Bertram (Minnesota politician) (born 1954)